Who Are the Girls? is the debut full-length album by British rock duo Nova Twins, released 28 February 2020 by 333 Wreckords Crew.

Background
The album is the group's first release with 333 Wreckords Crew, with which they signed in December 2019. It has been noted for its similarities to Enter Shikari and The Prodigy, but with elements of arena rock and nu-metal. The British music press has coined the term "grime punk" to describe the album's sound. The album was entirely recorded with live instruments, including extensive use of guitar and bass pedals, with no samples or synthesizers. 

The album's title is a reference to the experiences of Amy Love and Georgia South as black women attending rock concerts. In the years before the album's release, Nova Twins had been noted for their performances at British rock music festivals, in which most of the other participants were white males.  

The duo stated to Kerrang! that the album is "dedicated to all the people who are beautifully diverse and creating their own lanes. It’s a celebration of those who feel like they don’t fit in! The title is ironic, as there is little representation of diversity at the shows we play and there wasn’t any to see when we were growing up."

Critical reception 
Who Are the Girls? has received largely positive reviews. As of early 2021 the album has received a score of 81 out of 100 ("universal acclaim") at Metacritic. One mixed review came from The Soundboard, which described the limitations of the rock duo format and opined that Nova Twins have yet to fully develop their songwriting and lyrical outlook. However, the reviewer praised the group's distinctive sound.

NME called Who Are the Girls? "A hyperactive album that blends influences but refuses to play by anyone else’s rules, it’s a defiant, excitable debut." Kerrang! noted the album's "furious themes" and "explosive energy" and declared the Nova Twins' sound to be unique in the current rock music scene. DIY magazine made special note of the album's lyrics on gender inequality, sexual harassment, and "their audience’s listening capabilities." 

Clash magazine drew attention to Georgia South's unconventional, distorted bass lines and Amy Love's forceful vocals, while mentioning influences from not just punk and alternative rock but also garage rock, rave, and dubstep. In the words of a Distorted Sound reviewer, Who Are The Girls? is "an outrageous, off-the-wall collection of anthems that will make you reconsider what defines 'angry punk' from a new perspective that’s been overlooked and white-washed for decades."

Track listing

Personnel 
Nova Twins
 Amy Love – guitar, lead vocals
 Georgia South – bass, backing vocals

Additional personnel
 George MacDonald – drums on "Vortex", "Taxi", "Devil's Face", "Not My Day", "Undertaker" and "Athena"
 Tim Nugent – drums on "Play Fair", "Bullet" and "Lose Your Head"

References

2020 albums